The Minister of Resettlement, Reconstruction and Hindu Religious Affairs is an appointment in the Cabinet of Sri Lanka.

List of Resettlement Ministers
Parties

References

External links
 Ministry of Resettlement, Reconstruction and Hindu Religious Affairs
 Bureau of Commissioner General Rehabilitation
 Government of Sri Lanka

Resettlement
Government ministries of Sri Lanka